Agustina Casas Seré Leguizamon (born June 23, 1984) is an international award-winning digital artist. Her digital art collection "Ensueños Rioplatenses," was declared a "National Work of Tourist Interest" by the government of Uruguay, the highest artistic honor awarded by that nation (analogous to the United States National Medal of Arts). Casas was also officially declared a "Young Leader in Latin America" by the Washington, D.C.-based Inter-American Development Bank (IBD).  Casas was named by the Museum of the Americas as "one of the most influential artists of 2015," and she was permanently admitted to its 100 Certified Artists Organization.  Casas' work has been exhibited across the globe, including as part of Google's Project for New Media in New York and in private commissions and exhibitions by Fortune 500 companies, such as Fiat (2013) and Goodyear (2014).

Biography 
Casas spent her formative years living in Bonn, Germany and The Hague, Netherlands, where her parents served as diplomats.  It was in Europe, at age 8, that she developed an early passion for fine art and design.  For the next two decades, Casas returned to South America to complete her studies in Argentina and Uruguay and to launch her career as an artist.  As a young protégée, her talent was quickly recognized by world-renowned international artists Yaacov Agam, who gave Casas her earliest formal instruction.

Art career 
At age 24, Casas' paintings debuted publicly in 2009 in Buenos Aires at the Castagnino Roldan Gallery.  Shortly thereafter, and inspired by Andy Warhol and others, Casas began working with digital art, first by digitally transposing photographs of iconic historical figures and later by digitally reconstructing images of iconic sculptures.  One of her earliest digital pieces, Liberty, Fraternity and Equality, a tribute to the heroes of the early 19th century Latin-American Wars of Independence, was curated by Google and included in its "Project for New Media" in New York later that same year.

Casas followed the success of "Liberty, Fraternity and Equality" in 2011 by releasing a collection of digital work entitled "Ensueños Rioplatenses," earning her numerous national and international awards at age 27. "Ensueños Rioplatenses" was inspired by the work of Casas' great-grandfather, the famous Argentine sculptor Gonzalo Leguizamon Pondal (1890-1944).  Her work, a digitally reinterpreted collection of iconic sculpture images, paid tribute to the stylistic bond that Leguizamon Pondal shared with his contemporary, the Uruguayan sculptor Jose Luiz Zorrilla de San Martin (1891–1975), both of whom in 1931 became their respective county's first artists to win France's National Salon of Paris Académie des Beaux-Arts prize.

Ten of the twenty-six Ensueños Rioplatenses pieces were immediately curated for Uruguay's Bicentennial, a national event commemorating the 200th Anniversary of the country's May Revolution, and Casas was named as Official Artist of the Bicentennial of Uruguay.  The full collection was then displayed in a solo exhibition at both the National Museum Zorrilla and the Santos Cultural Palace in Uruguay.  Within months, the entire collection was declared by Uruguay's Ministry of Culture as a "Work of National Tourist Interest," the highest artistic honor awarded by the government of Uruguay, and she was described as a "young iconic artist."

References

External links 
 
 Castagnino Roldan
 Saatchi Art, Agustina Casas Sere-Leguizamon

1984 births
Living people
21st-century Uruguayan women artists
Digital artists
Women digital artists
People from Montevideo
University of Palermo (Buenos Aires) alumni
Uruguayan businesspeople